Makhmud Gurbanov (born 10 May 1973) is a football midfielder from Azerbaijan. He has won Azerbaijani championship record 12 times with six different teams.

He started his career in FC Kapaz, and has since played for PFC Neftchi, Kapaz (second spell) and FK Shamkir before he played abroad with Iranian team Foolad FC and Ukrainian team FC Tavriya Simferopol. He later rejoined PFC Neftchi. He then signed with FC Inter Baku, where he played until he joined Sumgayit FC.

National team statistics
Source:

International Goals

Honours

Individual
Azerbaijani Footballer of the Year (1): 2007.

References

External links

Profile on FK Baku Official Site
AzeriFootball

 

1973 births
Living people
Azerbaijani footballers
Azerbaijan international footballers
Azerbaijani expatriate footballers
Azerbaijani Shia Muslims
Ukrainian Premier League players
Foolad FC players
Expatriate footballers in Iran
Expatriate footballers in Ukraine
Azerbaijani expatriate sportspeople in Ukraine
SC Tavriya Simferopol players
Shamakhi FK players
Khazar Lankaran FK players
FC Baku players
Sportspeople from Ganja, Azerbaijan
Sumgayit FK players
FK Shamkir players
Association football midfielders